Scare Tactics is a comic book series published by DC Comics. A total of twelve issues were published, dated from December 1996 to March 1998. The series, written by Len Kaminski, was a part of DC's Weirdoverse group of titles.

Fictional biography
The series focused on the band Scare Tactics, teenage monsters who escaped from government custody and decided to hide in plain sight by becoming traveling rock and roll musicians, trying to escape their pasts while encountering supernatural adventures on the road.

The band members consisted of:
 Arnold Burnsteel (manager/bus driver) - a conspiracy theorist who rescued the rest of the cast from the top secret R-Complex facility in New Mexico with the help of his friend Jared Stevens, a smuggler of arcane artifacts transformed into the ankh-scarred, mystic golden blade-wielding demon hunter known as Fate.
 Fang (lead guitarist Jake Ketchum) - a hard-rocking hillbilly werewolf fleeing from an arranged marriage meant to end a long-running feud between two Appalachian creature clans.
 Gross-Out (drummer Philbert Hoskins) - once a bullied fat kid obsessed with astronomy mutated by meteorite radiation into a hulking and hungry grey sludge monster; despite his revolting appearance and inability to talk clearly, he is intelligent, goodhearted and extremely loyal to his bandmates who are the first real friends he has ever had, and eventually when his mutation reaches its final form he evolves into a perfect god-like being who flies off to be among the stars he loves.
 Scream Queen (lead singer Nina Skorzeny) - sexy and cynical human-hating vampire who came to America to escape the "ethnic cleansing" of her kind in her native Markovia; like Carmilla, she can turn into a black cat.
 Slither (bass guitarist James Tilton) - a human-reptile hybrid created by scientist father as part of his medical experiments who secretly has a crush on Nina but worried that the increasing viciousness of his lizard side could cause him to hurt her and his friends.

Promotion
In an attempt to promote the series, Kaminski planned to organize a "real-life ST fan club package", which would've included, among other things, a cassette recording of a song by the fictional band. Though he went as far as hiring a band and producing cassettes out-of-pocket, DC put a stop to his unlicensed plan before distribution took place.

DC Comics promoted the book in the middle of the series’ run through their "Plus" line, a series of one-shots that paired the characters with other notable DC characters:
Catwoman Plus #1 (featuring Scream Queen)
Impulse Plus #1 (featuring Gross-Out)
Robin Plus #2 (featuring Fang)
Superboy Plus #2 (featuring Slither)

References

External links

DC Comics titles
1996 comics debuts
Music-themed comics
Fictional musical groups
Vampires in comics
Werewolf comics
Horror comics